Thomas Mullen (20 June 1896 – 2 January 1966) was an Irish Fianna Fáil politician and school teacher.

He was born in Roemore, Breaffy, County Mayo, to primary school teacher parents, Thomas and Mary Mullen (née Coggins) He was educated at St Jarlath's College, Tuam, and University College Galway. He too became a teacher and taught in Tullamore and North Brunswick St and at St Saviour's, Denmark St, in Dublin.

Mullen became active in the Irish Republican Army after the 1916 Easter Rising. He was the organiser of the escape from Rath Camp in the Curragh Camp during the Irish War of Independence. During the Irish Civil War, he was leader of the Tintown No 1 internment camp of 61 prisoners.

He was elected to Dáil Éireann as a Teachta Dála (TD) for the Dublin County constituency at the 1938 general election. He did not contest the 1943 general election.

His brother Eugene Mullen, was a TD for Mayo from June to September 1927.

Mullen died in St Mary's Hospital, Phoenix Park. His last residence was 92 St Assam's Ave, Raheny, Dublin. He was survived by his wife, Louisa (née Ryan), and three daughters. He is buried at St. Fintan's Cemetery, Sutton.

References

1896 births
1966 deaths
Alumni of the University of Galway
Irish schoolteachers
Irish Republican Army (1919–1922) members
Politicians from County Mayo
Fianna Fáil TDs
Members of the 10th Dáil
People from Raheny
People educated at St Jarlath's College